Ráðbarðr, Raðbarðr or Rathbarth (late 7th century) was a legendary king of Garðaríki, who appears in Sögubrot and the Lay of Hyndla. 

Sögubrot tells that he married the fugitive princess Auðr the Deep-Minded without the consent of her father king Ivar Vidfamne, who soon departed to punish his daughter. He died en route, however, and so Ráðbarðr helped Auð's son Harald Wartooth claim his maternal grandfather's possessions in Sweden and Denmark. 

Ráðbarðr and Auðr had a son together named Randver.

Kings in Norse mythology and legends